Nicholas Springer (June 9, 1985 – April 14, 2021) was an American Paralympic wheelchair rugby player and a four-time national champion, and gold medalist from New York, New York. In 2006 and 2010, he was awarded a gold medal for his participation at the World championships and in 2008 he won Canada Cup and got another gold that way. The same year Springer won a silver medal for his participation at the North American Cup and won a gold medal at the 2008 Paralympic Games in Beijing, China. In 2012 he won his first bronze medal at the 2012 Summer Paralympics in London. Besides rugby, he played hockey for 14 years. He was also an avid traveler and enjoyed outdoor activities and scuba diving. Springer died suddenly in 2021 at the age of 35 while swimming at a friend's house.

References

1985 births
2021 deaths
Paralympic wheelchair rugby players of the United States
Paralympic gold medalists for the United States
Paralympic bronze medalists for the United States
American wheelchair rugby players
Sportspeople from Denver
Wheelchair rugby players at the 2008 Summer Paralympics
Place of death missing
Wheelchair rugby players at the 2012 Summer Paralympics
Medalists at the 2008 Summer Paralympics
Medalists at the 2012 Summer Paralympics
Eckerd College alumni
Paralympic medalists in wheelchair rugby
Sportspeople from New York City